Pablo Fornals Malla (born 22 February 1996) is a Spanish professional footballer who plays mainly as an attacking midfielder for Premier League club West Ham United and the Spain national team.

He amassed La Liga totals of 129 matches and 12 goals over four seasons, with Málaga and Villarreal. In 2019, he signed with West Ham United.

Fornals made his senior debut for Spain in 2016.

Club career

Málaga
Born in Castellón de la Plana, Valencian Community, Fornals joined Málaga CF's youth setup in 2012 at the age of 16, from CD Castellón. He made his senior debut with the reserves in the 2014–15 season, in Tercera División.

Fornals' first competitive match with the first team – and in La Liga – occurred on 26 September 2015, when he started in a 0–0 away draw against Real Madrid. Two months and two days later, he scored his first top-flight goal in a 2–2 draw with Andalusian neighbours Granada CF at La Rosaleda Stadium, finding the net four minutes after replacing Duda.

On 4 December 2016, Fornals scored a brace in a 2–2 draw at Valencia CF.

Villarreal
On 24 July 2017, having paid his own €12 million buyout clause to leave Málaga, Fornals moved to fellow league side Villarreal CF, a club he already represented as a youth, agreeing to a five-year contract. The following 13 January, he scored a late chip after a counterattack to give his new team their first-ever win against Real Madrid at the Santiago Bernabéu Stadium (1–0).

On 26 September 2018, Fornals opened the scoring in a league fixture away to Athletic Bilbao with a dipping volley from 50 yards, in an eventual 3–0 victory.

West Ham United
On 14 June 2019, Fornals signed for West Ham United on a five-year contract for a transfer fee reported to be £24 million, making him the English club's second most expensive signing. He made his Premier League debut on 10 August, in a 5–0 home defeat by Manchester City coming on as a half-time substitute for Michail Antonio. He scored his first goal for his new team on 27 August, in a 2–0 victory over Newport County for the second round of the EFL Cup.

International career
On 28 March 2016, Fornals won his first cap with the Spain under-21s by playing the full 90 minutes in a 1–0 win against Norway at the Estadio Nueva Condomina. On 17 May, he was called up to the full squad by Vicente del Bosque for a friendly with Bosnia and Herzegovina. He made his debut 12 days later, replacing Mikel San José in the 3–1 victory at the AFG Arena in St. Gallen, Switzerland.

Fornals was a member of the team which won the 2019 UEFA European Under-21 Championship in June. In the tournament held in Italy and San Marino, he scored in group stage defeats of Belgium (2–1) and Poland (5–0). 

In June 2021, Fornals was called up as a standby for Spain’s UEFA Euro 2020 squad following Sergio Busquets' positive test for COVID-19. Making his first start on 8 September, against Kosovo in a 2022 FIFA World Cup qualifier, he scored his first goal for the national side when he opened a 2–0 win in Pristina.

Personal life
Fornals' fiancée, Lara, gave birth to their son Martín in November 2021.

Career statistics

Club

International

Scores and results list Spain's goal tally first.

Honours
Spain U21
UEFA European Under-21 Championship: 2019

Spain
UEFA Nations League runner-up: 2020–21

References

External links
West Ham United official profile (archive)

1996 births
Living people
Sportspeople from Castellón de la Plana
Spanish footballers
Footballers from the Valencian Community
Association football midfielders
La Liga players
Tercera División players
Atlético Malagueño players
Málaga CF players
Villarreal CF players
Premier League players
West Ham United F.C. players
Spain under-21 international footballers
Spain international footballers
Spanish expatriate footballers
Expatriate footballers in England
Spanish expatriate sportspeople in England